Lionel Tobias Boas (1875 – 16 August 1949) was a prominent public official from Western Australia.

Biography

Early life
Lionel Tobias Boas was born in 1875 in South Australia. His father was Rabbi Abraham Boas (1844–1923).

Career
He moved to Perth, Western Australia, in 1896. A decade later, in 1906, he was elected a councillor to the City of Subiaco, serving for thirty-six years and was mayor of Subiaco from 1917 to 1920. With Jack Simons, he helped establish the Young Australia League in 1905 and served as its president until his death in 1949.

References

1875 births
1949 deaths
People from South Australia
People from Perth, Western Australia
Australian people of Dutch-Jewish descent
Jewish Australian politicians
Mayors of places in Western Australia
Western Australian local councillors